Buseje Bailey is a Canadian artist and curator working in video and multi-media whose work explores the construction of the diasporic Black self. Bailey's multidisciplinary work explores themes of the Black diasporic identity and women's history. Her video work is distributed by V tape in Toronto. She was cited as an outstanding Black Canadian artist in a 2018 article published by the Canadian Broadcasting Corporation.

Early life and education
Bailey earned her BFA at York University, Toronto in 1981 and her MFA from the Nova Scotia College of Art and Design in 1991.

Exhibitions
Solo exhibitions of Bailey's work have been held at McGill University (Body Politics, 1994) and the Eye Level Gallery, Halifax (Making Connections Across Art Forms, 1995). The Women's Art Resource Centre held an exhibition of her work entitled The Viewing Room in 1999. Her work was also featured in the exhibition Black Body : Race, Resistance, Response, curated by Pamela Edmonds in 2001 at Dalhousie Art Gallery in Halifax, Nova Scotia.

Bailey is a co-founder of the Diasporic African Women's Art Collective (DAWA). In 1989, Bailey participated as both a co-curator and an artist in the group exhibition Black Wimmin: When and Where We Enter, an exhibition organized by DAWA. It was the first exhibition in Canada to focus entirely on the work of Black women artists. The show toured across Canada and has become a foundation for organizing efforts by Black women artists and curators.

Bailey's work was paired with Walter Redinger's in an exhibition at the McIntosh Gallery, University of Western Ontario, in 1998.

Bailey was a featured subject in the 2017 exhibition Light Grows the Tree at BAND Gallery (Black Artists' Network in Dialogue) in Toronto, which featured photographic portraits of leading Black Canadian artists, authors, curators and collectors.

Selected videography 

 Women of Strength, Women of Beauty (1992), 16:30 minutes, color, English
 Blood (1992), 06:00 minutes, color, English with closed captions
 Identity in Isolation (1995), 16:00 minutes, color, English
 Quest For History (1998), 23:30 minutes, color, English
 Fear Factor (2022), 12:00 minutes, color, English

References

External links
 Collections Canada: Buseje Bailey
 V tape artist page for Buseje Bailey

Canadian video artists
20th-century Canadian artists
21st-century Canadian artists
Canadian contemporary artists
Black Canadian filmmakers
York University alumni
NSCAD University alumni
Living people
Year of birth missing (living people)
20th-century Canadian women artists
21st-century Canadian women artists
Black Canadian artists